Fountainhead is an album by pianist Andy LaVerne recorded in 1989 and released on the Danish label, SteepleChase.

Reception 

Ken Dryden of AllMusic stated "Andy LaVerne has developed into a top-notch pianist, particularly during his tenure on Steeplechase. This duo date with Dave Samuels, who switches between vibes and marimba on this date, has the energy of Chick Corea's duets with Gary Burton".

Track listing 
All compositions by Andy LaVerne except where noted.

 "All the Things You Are" (Jerome Kern, Oscar Hammerstein II) – 6:02
 "Severe Clear" – 7:57
 "ATB" – 4:41
 "Come to Me" – 4:43
 "My Asian Land" (Dave Samuels) – 5:09
 "ECB" (Samuels) – 4:55
 "Fountainhead" – 3:53
 "Round Corners" (Samuels) – 7:13
 "Summer Night" (Al Dubin, Harry Warren) – 6:54
 "Waiting for You" (Samuels) – 3:15
 "How Deep Is the Ocean?" (Irving Berlin) – 4:57

Personnel 
Andy LaVerne – piano
Dave Samuels – vibraphone, marimba

References 

Andy LaVerne albums
1990 albums
SteepleChase Records albums